Longarenus is a spider genus of the family Salticidae (jumping spiders). Its only described species, Longarenus brachycephalus, is endemic to Equatorial Guinea.

References

Salticidae
Endemic fauna of Equatorial Guinea
Arthropods of Equatorial Guinea
Monotypic Salticidae genera
Spiders of Africa